St. Ann's Head Lighthouse is a lighthouse that overlooks the entrance to the Milford Haven waterway, one of Britain's deep water harbours, from St. Ann's Head near Dale in Pembrokeshire.

The lighthouse is intended to guide ships around a number of rocky shoals that cause a hazard to shipping entering the Haven as well as Crow's rock. The current lighthouse was completed in 1844 (at which time it was known as "St. Ann's Low Light") and commissioned by John Knott, senior lighthouse keeper with Trinity House. The first lighthouse on this site was built in 1714.
 
Visible is Skokholm Lighthouse on the small island of Skokholm  to the west.

See also

 List of lighthouses in Wales

References

External links

 www.geograph.co.uk Photos of St. Ann's Head Lighthouse
 Trinity House

Lighthouses completed in 1841
Lighthouses in Pembrokeshire
1714 establishments in Wales